United Nations Security Council Resolution 402, adopted on December 22, 1976, after hearing from the Minister of Foreign Affairs for Lesotho, the Council expressed concern at South Africa's decision to close the border with Lesotho in many areas in an attempt to pressure the country to recognise the "independence" of the bantustan Transkei. After recalling previous resolutions, the Council praised Lesotho for not recognising Transkei and stated it will organise economic assistance to the country from the organisation itself and other countries to help it overcome the blockade by South Africa.

The resolution went on to ask the Secretary-General to monitor the situation in the region and to later report to the Security Council.

No details of the voting were given, other than that it was "adopted by consensus".

See also
 List of United Nations Security Council Resolutions 401 to 500 (1976–1982)
 South Africa under apartheid

References
Text of the Resolution at undocs.org

External links
 

 0402
Transkei
 0402
 0402
1976 in South Africa
December 1976 events
Lesotho–South Africa relations